Thomas St Lawrence may refer to:
 Thomas St Lawrence (bishop), bishop of Cork and Ross
 Thomas St. Lawrence (judge), statesman and judge in Ireland
 Thomas St Lawrence, 13th Baron Howth, Irish nobleman
 Thomas St Lawrence, 1st Earl of Howth, Anglo-Irish peer and lawyer
 Thomas St Lawrence, 3rd Earl of Howth, Irish peer